John Hamilton (1855–1904) was an English cricketer. He played in two first-class matches in New Zealand for Wellington from 1877 to 1880.

See also
 List of Wellington representative cricketers

References

External links

1855 births
1904 deaths
English cricketers
Wellington cricketers
Cricketers from Exeter